Jorge Manuel Martins da Silva (born 12 August 1954), known as Martins, is a retired  Portuguese footballer who played as a goalkeeper.

Football career
Martins was born in Alhos Vedros, Moita, Setúbal District. During his professional career, which spanned nearly 20 years, he played for F.C. Barreirense, Vitória de Setúbal (three spells), S.L. Benfica, S.C. Farense and C.F. Os Belenenses, appearing in more than 600 matches as a professional, 310 in the Primeira Liga alone.

Martins was a participant at UEFA Euro 1984 and the 1986 FIFA World Cup, as a backup to Manuel Bento in the former – he was also his reserve during his two-year spell at Benfica – and third-choice in the latter behind Bento and Vítor Damas. He never gained a senior cap, however.

Honours
Primeira Liga: 1980–81
Taça de Portugal: 1980–81, 1988–89
Supertaça Cândido de Oliveira: 1980

External links

1954 births
Living people
Portuguese footballers
Association football goalkeepers
Primeira Liga players
Liga Portugal 2 players
F.C. Barreirense players
Vitória F.C. players
S.L. Benfica footballers
S.C. Farense players
C.F. Os Belenenses players
UEFA Euro 1984 players
1986 FIFA World Cup players
People from Moita
Sportspeople from Setúbal District